Phillip Bennion (born 7 October 1954) is a British Liberal Democrat politician. He served as a Member of the European Parliament (MEP) for the West Midlands from 2012 to 2014, and then from 2019 to 2020.

Early life and education
Bennion was born in Tamworth, Staffordshire and educated at Queen Elizabeth Grammar School. He went on to study agriculture and agronomy at Aberdeen and Newcastle. After returning to Staffordshire to run his family farm, he gained a second degree, in history and economic history, from the University of Birmingham.

Political career

Bennion advised Charles Kennedy on agricultural issues during his leadership of the Liberal Democrats. Bennion went on to serve on the party's federal policy committee for eight years.

European parliament
He was second on the party list for the West Midlands constituency at the 2009 European Parliament election, but the party's 12% share of the vote entitled them to only one seat. When Liz Lynne stepped down in February 2012, electoral rules meant that Bennion, as the next Liberal Democrat candidate on the list, took her seat. He stood for re-election in 2014 and was placed top of his party's list of candidates, but he lost his seat as the Liberal Democrats polled 5.6% of the vote, too little to secure one of the West Midlands' seven seats. He re-gained his seat in 2019.

He sat on the Committee on Foreign Affairs and the Sub-Committee on Human Rights, and also acted as a substitute on the Committee on the Internal Market and Consumer Protection, as a member of the 9th Parliament from July 2019 to January 2020.

Electoral history
He served as a councillor on Lichfield District Council from 1999 to 2011,

Staffordshire County Council, 2002–2005. By-election win in 2002 narrowly lost in May 2005.

Parliamentary candidate for Lichfield (UK Parliament constituency), 1997 & 2001, for the Tamworth (UK Parliament constituency) in 2005, Telford (UK Parliament constituency) in 2010 and Birmingham Hodge Hill (UK Parliament constituency) in 2015 and 2017

European Parliamentary Candidate for West Midlands (European Parliament constituency) in 1999, 2004 and 2009, being elected to No2 on the Liberal Democrats' regional list in 2009 taking his seat in 2012 after Liz Lynne stepped down. Phil was re-elected as no1 on the Liberal Democrats' regional list in 2019.

2019 

Anthea McIntyre became an MEP in November 2011 when the relevant provisions of the Treaty of Lisbon came into effect, her addition being based on the 2009 vote. Phil Bennion became an MEP on the resignation of Liz Lynne.

Footnotes

External links 
Phil Bennion profile at the European Parliament

1954 births
Living people
Alumni of the University of Aberdeen
Alumni of Newcastle University
Alumni of the University of Birmingham
People from Tamworth, Staffordshire
Liberal Democrats (UK) MEPs
Liberal Democrats (UK) councillors
Members of Staffordshire County Council
MEPs for England 2009–2014
MEPs for England 2019–2020
Liberal Democrats (UK) parliamentary candidates